The Mataroa River is a river of New Zealand. It is a tributary of the Northland Region's Whakapara River, which it meets close to the settlement of Opuawhanga.

See also
List of rivers of New Zealand

References

Rivers of the Northland Region
Rivers of New Zealand
Kaipara Harbour catchment